Craspedoxantha marginalis is a species of tephritid or fruit flies in the genus Craspedoxantha of the family Tephritidae.

Distribution
Gambia, Sudan, Ethiopia South to Angola, South Africa.

References

Tephritinae
Insects described in 1818
Diptera of Africa